Konstruktivits is a British industrial band. Formed in 1982, they were mostly active in the 1980s, with recording activity continuing until today.

The band was formed by Glenn Michael Wallis from his previous band Heute, a krautrock-influenced trio. 1990s members were Glenn Michael Wallis, Mark Crumby, Lawrence Burton, Joseph Ahmed, and R. Alcapone Shiells.

Glenn Michael Wallis worked as musician on early releases by Whitehouse, he worked solo under the name of Vagina Dentata Organ with permission by Jordi Valls, and he was member of the band projects Dark Union, Heute, The Murray Fontana Orchestra as a side-project of Hafler Trio.
 
Mark Crumby was member of the bands Ghost Actor, Mitra Mitra, Oppenheimer MKII, and Statik.

In 2000, Wallis changed the band's name to Konstruktivist, with the spelling Konstruktivists also being used. During the last years Wallis and Crumby run Konstruktivists as a duo.

Discography

Albums
A Dissembly (Flowmotion LP, 1982)
Psykho Genetika (Third Mind Records TM02 LP,  1983)
Black December (Third Mind Records TMLP05 LP, 1984)
Glennascaul (Sterile Records SR10 LP, 1985)
Live at the King Charles Ballroom (Harsh Reality Music HR46 cassette, 1985)
Spanish Movements (Harsh Reality Music HR11 cassette, 1986; Alternate Media Tapes ALMED143 cassette, 1989)
NKVD Compilation (with NKVD and Vagina Dentata Organ) (Audiofile Tapes aT77 cassette, 1989)
Dark Odyssey (self-release, 2006)
Anarchic Avcadia (Exklageto 12 CD, 2015)
Fluxus +/- (with Foltergaul & Kommissar Hjuler & Mama Baer (Psych.KG 543  LP, 2020)

Compilation appearances
"Beirut" (live) on Untitled (Requiem Productions cassette) 	 
"Andropov '84" on The Elephant Table Album (Xtract Xx001 2×LP, 1983)
"Shadows of White Sand" on Cadavres Exquis (Chimik Communications cassette, 1984)
"How You Say" on Funky Alternatives Three (Concrete Productions/Pinpoint Records CD, 1989)
"Black on Black" on Rising from the Red Sand Vol. 1 (RRRecords/Statutory Tapes STATAP 09 A cassette)
"Masonik 1" on Rising from the Red Sand Vol. 3 (RRRecords/Statutory Tapes STATAP 09 C cassette)

References

External links
Kontruktivits (discogs.com)
Konsort (home page)
konstruktivists.com (official home page)
Konstruktivits at Last.fm

English electronic music groups
British industrial music groups
English new wave musical groups
Third Mind Records artists
Cassette culture 1970s–1990s